Major Motion is a video game written for the Atari ST by Philip McKenzie and Jeffrey Sorenson and published by MichTron in 1986. An Amiga version followed in 1988. Major Motion is a clone of the Spy Hunter arcade game.

Gameplay
Major Motion is a game in which racers can kill their enemies, and shoot and sideswipe the other cars.

Reception
Gregg Williams reviewed the game for Computer Gaming World, and stated that "Overall, the game is laudable."

Reviews
Atari ST User - August 1986
Aktueller Software Markt - August 1986
Tilt - January 1987

References

External links
Review in .info
Review in Page 6
Review in Current Notes
Review in ANALOG Computing

1986 video games
Action video games
Amiga games
Atari ST games
Vehicular combat games
Video game clones
Video games developed in the United States